Bohdan Sichkaruk (born 1 August 1994) is a professional Ukrainian football striker who plays for FC Chaika Kyiv-Sviatoshyn Raion.

Born in Tetiiv, Kyiv Oblast, Ukraine, Sichkaruk is a product of Kyiv Oblast youth sportive school system. He was renewed after the long injury and signed a contract with FC Vorskla. Made his debut for FC Vorskla in game against FC Hoverla Uzhhorod on 8 August 2014 in the Ukrainian Premier League. During the winter-break of the 2015–16 season Sickaruk signed with Serbian side FK Napredak Kruševac and played in the second half of the 2015–16 Serbian First League. At the end of the season, Napredak finished top, and achieved promotion to the SuperLiga, however, Sichkaruk left the club and returned to Ukraine where he joined FC Chaika Kyiv-Sviatoshyn Raion.

Honours
Napredak Kruševac
Serbian First League: 2015–16

References

External links 

1994 births
Living people
Ukrainian footballers
Ukrainian Premier League players
FC Vorskla Poltava players
FK Napredak Kruševac players
Serbian First League players
Expatriate footballers in Serbia
Association football forwards